Albin Čižman (born 30 August 1965) is a Yugoslav-born, Slovenian slalom canoeist who competed from the mid-1980s to the mid-1990s. He won a gold medal in the K1 team event at the 1989 ICF Canoe Slalom World Championships in Savage River. He also finished ninth in the K1 event at the 1992 Summer Olympics in Barcelona.

Čižman was born in Ljubljana.

World Cup individual podiums

References

External links 
 Albin CIZMAN at CanoeSlalom.net

1965 births
Canoeists at the 1992 Summer Olympics
Living people
Olympic canoeists of Slovenia
Slovenian male canoeists
Yugoslav male canoeists
Sportspeople from Ljubljana
Medalists at the ICF Canoe Slalom World Championships